Carine Quadros (born September 27, 1981) is a Brazilian actress.

Television
 2001 - Porto dos Milagres, Malhação, As filhas da Mãe, O Clone
 2002 - Globo Ciência, Vale Todo, Coração de Estudante
 2003 - Jamais Te Esquecerei...Hilda
 2004 - Vila Maluca...Gigi
2005 - Portos land

Filmography
 1999 - Boneca de Papel
 1999 - O Homem Invisível
 2000 - A Vida de Glauber Rocha
 2001 - Focus
 2002 - Divergências
 2004 - Garotos da Cidade

References

External links

Living people
Brazilian film actresses
Brazilian stage actresses
Brazilian television actresses
Brazilian telenovela actresses
1981 births
People from Minas Gerais